Greenhills College is a secondary school situated on Limekiln Avenue, Greenhills in South Dublin. It accommodates Junior Certificate, Leaving Certificate and Leaving Certificate Applied students and offers the Leaving Certificate Vocational Programme to its students. It is run by the Dublin and Dun Laoghaire Education and Training Board (DDLETB) and is a non-fee paying school.

Greenhills College opened in 1970 in Crumlin, and moved to its present site in 1972. In 1973, Greenhills College offered adult education and leisure-type classes to the local community. The college also provides post-Leaving Certificate (PLC) and Vocational Training Opportunities Scheme (VTOS) courses for adult learners.

The school competes in a number of sports and extra curricular activities including Gaelic football, hurling, soccer, basketball, boxing, and Gaelic handball. Greenhills represented Ireland at the World Schools Games in Sweden in 1991. In 2015, the school won its first title in hurling. Ireland's only ever Olympic Gold medalist in Boxing Michael Carruth is a former student of Greenhills College which he attended with his two brothers.

Curriculum
The curriculum offered covers a number of common subjects in the State Examinations including German, Art, Music, Business, Engineering, Materials Technology Wood, Construction, Metalwork, Religious Education, Science and History.

In addition to the Leaving Certificate Vocational Programme (a voluntary programme run in the college), a number of subjects are taught at the school in both the Junior Certificate and Leaving Certificate cycles.

Extra curricular activities

Sports
Gaelic football, hurling, soccer and basketball teams are the main team sports played at Greenhills College.
The school has won Ireland's premier national soccer title the Dr. Tony O' Neill cup on two occasions in 1980/81 and 1990/91, representing Ireland in the 1991 World Schools Cup in Sweden.

Dr. Tony O' Neill Cup (Leinster Under 19 A) (2): 1980/81, 1990/91
John Murphy Cup (Leinster Under 19 B) (1): 2010/11
Tom Ticher Cup (Leinster Under 17 A) (4): 1983/84, 1985/86, 1989/90, 1994/95
Minor Cup (Leinster Under 15 A) (6): 1980/81, 1981/82, 1984/85, 1987/88, 1992/93, 1995/96

Clubs and events
The college has a number of clubs and societies including a Student Council, Enterprise Club, ECO Club and a Cooking Club.

Each year, Seachtain na Gaeilge (literally, "Week of Irish") events are organised to promote the Irish language in the school. The Irish department organises events, including a ceili dance, poc fada (long hit) and the screening of Irish films.

An annual Mind Your Mind event has been held since 2016 to promote the importance of speaking up on issues prevalent to the youth of today especially among young adult males.

Facilities
The college has three science laboratories, two art classrooms, two woodwork classrooms, two engineering classrooms, five computer rooms, a technical graphics rooms and over 40 classrooms. Greenhills College has a separate P.E. hall and gymnasium on the school grounds.

Adult education
Greenhills College of Further Education runs full and part-time PLC qualifications in Business, Computing, Engineering, Healthcare, Sports, Art, Pre-university Arts and VTOS courses. The courses take place in the Further-Ed section of the college.

Some of the adult education courses are FETAC accredited.

Notable alumni
Paul Bealin, former Dublin GAA footballer and winner of the 1995 All-Ireland Senior Football Championship
Liam Buckley, association footballer and manager
Mark Byrne, association footballer
 Michael Carruth, Irish Olympic boxer and Olympic gold medalist
 Stephen Gleeson, association footballer with Ipswich Town F.C.
 Jacknife Lee, Grammy award winning record producer and musician.
 Paul Newe, former association professional footballer who scored 103 goals in the League of Ireland
 Niall O'Toole, Irish Olympic rower and world gold medalist
 Gary Thomson, a former cyclist who competed in the individual road race and the team time trial events at the 1984 Summer Olympics.
 Mark Yeates, association footballer with Eastleigh F.C.

References

External links
 Greenhills College website

Boys' schools in the Republic of Ireland
Secondary schools in South Dublin (county)
Educational institutions established in 1970
Education in Dublin (city)
Secondary schools in County Dublin